Basketball, for the 2017 Island Games, held at the ICA Maxi Arena, Visby, Gotland, Sweden in June 2017.

Medal table

Results

References

2017 in basketball
Basketball at the Island Games
Basketball
2016–17 in Swedish basketball
International basketball competitions hosted by Sweden